Papyrus 30 (in the Gregory-Aland numbering), designated by 𝔓30, is an early copy of the New Testament in Greek. It is a papyrus manuscript of the Pauline epistles, it contains only 1 Thess 4:12-5:18. 25-28; 2 Thess 1:1-2; 2:1.9-11. The manuscript paleographically has been assigned to the 3rd century.

Description 

The manuscript is written in large uncial letters. The nomina sacra are abbreviated. The number of the pages suggest that the manuscript was a collection of the Pauline epistles. It is a carefully executed manuscript.

The Greek text of this codex is a representative of the Alexandrian text-type (rather proto-Alexandrian). Aland placed it in Category I. According to Comfort this manuscript shows greater agreement with Codex Sinaiticus than with Vaticanus (in 11 out of 13 variants).

According to Grenfell it agrees four times with B against א A, once with BA against א, twice with א A against B, once with א against B A.

According to Comfort it was written in the early 3rd century.

It is currently housed at the Ghent University (Inv. 61) in Ghent.

See also 
 1 Thessalonians 5
 List of New Testament papyri

References

Further reading 

 B. P. Grenfell & A. S. Hunt, Oxyrynchus Papyri XIII, (London 1919), pp. 12–14.

External links 

 Image at holding institution
 Oxyrhynchus 1598

New Testament papyri
3rd-century biblical manuscripts
Early Greek manuscripts of the New Testament
First Epistle to the Thessalonians papyri
Second Epistle to the Thessalonians papyri